Anthony Sayer (c.1672 – 1741), on 24 June 1717 (the Feast of St. John the Baptist), at the formation of the first Premier Grand Lodge of England of freemasons at London, the members present elected as their first Grand Master "Anthony Sayer, Gentleman". He further served Grand Lodge as Senior Grand Warden under John Theophilus Desaguliers.

Apart from being London's first, he is also the Grand Master "about whom less definite information is known than any of his successors in that high office." He seems to have fallen on difficult times, probably falling foul of the "South Sea Bubble", like many of his contemporaries. He petitioned Grand Lodge for charity in 1724, 1730, and 1741. He also twice received assistance from the Old Kings Arms lodge, which he served as tyler, or outer guard. His death is recorded in the minutes of that lodge in the month prior to 6 January 1741/2.

Whatever his difficulties, he retained a great deal of respect amongst his brother Freemasons. The newspaper report of his funeral, in January 1741/2, states -

"A few days since died, aged about 70 years, Mr. Anthony Sayer, who was Grand Master of the most Ancient and Honorable Society of Free and Accepted Masons in 1717. His corpse was followed by a great number of Gentlemen of that Honorable Society of the best Quality, from the Shakespears Head Tavern in the Piazza in Covent Garden and decently interr’d in Covent-Garden church."

References

1672 births
1740s deaths
Grand Masters of the Premier Grand Lodge of England
Freemasons of the Premier Grand Lodge of England